Córdoba Athletic Club is an Argentine sports club in the city of Córdoba. Founded in 1882, Córdoba Athletic is the oldest sports club in Córdoba Province. The institution is mostly known for its rugby union team, which plays in the Torneo de Córdoba, the main tournament organised by Unión Cordobesa de Rugby.

The rugby team is one of the most successful in the province, having won the Torneo 16 times, the last in 2011. 

In field hockey, the club is affiliated to amateur Córdoba Field Hockey Federation, where its teams compete.

Other sports practiced at the club include tennis and swimming.

History
Like many Argentina sports and social clubs at the time, Córdoba Athletic Club was founded by English rail workers. The exact date of the club's creation is unknown but is thought to be either 17 April or 15 November 1882.

For its first few years in existence the club would be dominated by British expatriates and the official language at the club would be English. Originally, the club was founded as an athletics club. Rugby would only appear at CAC in 1898. For a time the club also played football, until it became professional in Argentina in 1931, being abandoned by the club.

As the only club in the province for a long time, CAC had to travel down to Rosario for competition. There, CAC would often compete with that city's oldest club Atlético del Rosario. The ties between both clubs remain strong today.

Although one of the most successful in the province, Córdoba Athletic as so far failed to make any impact on the national scene, unlike fellow Córdoba clubs such as Tala and La Tablada, which have both reached the Nacional de Clubes final.

Titles
Torneo de Córdoba (16): 1952, 1955, 1962, 1967, 1968, 1969, 1970, 1973, 1974, 1982, 1992, 1996, 2005, 2008, 2010, 2011

References

External links
 

c
c
1882 establishments in Argentina
Sports clubs established in 1882